Jeffrey van Nuland (born 16 December 1990) is a Dutch footballer who plays as a centre back for SteDoCo in the Derde Divisie.

References

Living people
1990 births
Footballers from Tilburg
Association football central defenders
Dutch footballers
Willem II (football club) players
RKC Waalwijk players
Helmond Sport players
Kozakken Boys players
Eredivisie players
Eerste Divisie players
Tweede Divisie players